King Township may refer to:

In Canada
 King Township, Ontario

In the United States
 King Township, Johnson County, Arkansas, in Johnson County, Arkansas
 King Township, Christian County, Illinois
 King Township, Winnebago County, Iowa
 King Township, Polk County, Minnesota
 King Township, Oregon County, Missouri
 King Township, Bedford County, Pennsylvania
 King Township, Tripp County, South Dakota, in Tripp County, South Dakota

Township name disambiguation pages